Live at Shelly's Manne-Hole is an album by pianist Les McCann recorded on New Year's Eve 1965 at Shelly's Manne-Hole and released on the Limelight label.

Reception

Allmusic gives the album 4 stars stating "This album is one of the best from this artist's early acoustic days".

Track listing 
All compositions by Les McCann except as indicated
 "She Broke My Heart (And I Broke Her Jaw)" - 4:23
 "I'll Be On Home" - 5:00
 "All Alone" (Irving Berlin) - 4:04
 "My Friends" - 5:15
 "I Could Have Danced All Night" (From My Fair Lady) (Frederick Loewe, Alan Jay Lerner) -  	3:32
 "That Was the Freak That Was" - 5:35
 "Young and Foolish" (From Plain and Fancy) (Albert Hague, Arnold B. Horwitt) - 6:47
 "How's Your Mother (Theme)" - 2:38

Personnel 
Les McCann - piano
Victor Gaskin - bass
Paul Humphrey - drums

References 

Les McCann live albums
1966 live albums
Limelight Records live albums
Albums recorded at Shelly's Manne-Hole